Rob Goffee is a British academic. He is an Emeritus Professor of Organisational Behaviour and former Deputy Dean at the London Business School. He is the author or co-author of eleven books, including Why should anyone be led by you? (co-authored with Gareth Jones), which became a bestseller.

Bibliography

References

Living people
Alumni of the University of Kent
Academics of London Business School
Year of birth missing (living people)